Allai may refer to:

 Allai District
 Allai, Sardinia
 Allai Valley